was a village located in Gujō District, Gifu Prefecture, Japan.

History
The village was established in 1897.

On March 1, 2004, Takasu, along with the towns of Hachiman, Shirotori and Yamato, and the villages of Meihō, Minami and Wara (all from Gujō District), was merged to create the city of Gujō.

Notes

External links
 Official website of Gujō 

Dissolved municipalities of Gifu Prefecture
Gujō, Gifu